Pierre Gendron may refer to:

 Pierre Gendron (academic) (1916–1984), Canadian academic
 Pierre Gendron (actor) (1896–1956), American actor and screenwriter

 Pierre-Samuel Gendron (1828–1889), notary and political figure in Quebec, Canada